Zarate is a hamlet and concejo located in the municipality of Zuia, in Álava province, Basque Country, Spain. It is located 20 km north-northwest of Vitoria-Gasteiz.

References

External links
 

Concejos in Zuia